Natasa Dusev-Janics (born 24 June 1982) is a Hungarian sprint canoer who has competed for Hungary since 2001 and has won six Olympic medals in the sprint canoe events.

Early life
Natasa grew up in Serbia and competed for FR Yugoslavia at the 2000 Summer Olympics before moving to Hungary. She is a daughter of Milan Janić (1957-2003), a Serbian canoer who won a silver medal for Yugoslavia in the 1984 Olympic Games in Los Angeles. Both her brothers, Mićo and Stjepan Janić, are canoers and have competed for Croatia since 2004. They took part in the 2008 Olympics, though Mićo was only nominated as a reserve.

Career
Janics won two Olympic gold medals in the sprint canoe events at the 2004 Summer Olympics, another gold and silver medal at the 2008 Summer Olympics and silver and bronze at the 2012 Summer Olympics. She has also won 26 medals at the ICF Canoe Sprint World Championships with 20 golds (K-1 200 m: 2007, 2009, 2010; K-2 200 m: 2005, 2006, 2009, 2010; K-2 500 m: 2005, 2006; K-2 1000 m: 2005, 2006; K-4 200 m: 2002, 2003, 2006; K-4 500 m: 2006, 2009, 2010; K-4 1000 m: 2003, 2006; K-1 200 m relay: 2013) and six silvers (K-1 500 m: 2010, K-1 : 2009, 2010; K-2 200 m: 2015; K-2 500 m: 2013; K-4 200 m: 2009).

She was elected Hungarian Sportswoman of the Year in 2004 and 2010. Together with Katalin Kovács she earned the title Hungarian Sportsteam of the year in 2005, 2006 and 2010.

On 4 October 2012 it was revealed that she made a decision to return and compete under the flag of her native country, Serbia. On 9 March 2013 she informed the Hungarian Canoe Federation in a letter about changing her mind and her wish to compete for Hungary during her professional career.

She's been suffering from a herniated disc in her neck since 2012; in 2019 she has stated that it's reached a point where she is considering retirement.

Awards
 Yugoslav Young Athlete of the Year: 2000
 Hungarian kayaker of the Year (4): 2004, 2005, 2006, 2010
 Hungarian Sportswoman of the Year (2) - votes of sports journalists: 2004, 2010
 Hungarian Athlete of the Year (1) - the National Sports Association (NSSZ) awards: 2004
 Person of the Year by Magyar Szó: 2004
 Member of the Hungarian team of year (with Katalin Kovács): 2005, 2006, 2010
 Príma Primissima award (2006)
 Pro Universitate (2008)

Orders and special awards
   Order of Merit of the Republic of Hungary – Officer's Cross (2004)
   Order of Merit of the Republic of Hungary – Commander's Cross (2008)
   Order of Merit of Hungary – Commander's Cross with Star (2012)

References

 Canoe09.ca profile

External links
 
 

1982 births
Living people
People from Bačka Palanka
Canoeists at the 2000 Summer Olympics
Canoeists at the 2004 Summer Olympics
Canoeists at the 2008 Summer Olympics
Canoeists at the 2012 Summer Olympics
Canoeists at the 2016 Summer Olympics
Hungarian female canoeists
Hungarian people of Serbian descent
Olympic canoeists of Hungary
Olympic canoeists of Yugoslavia
Olympic gold medalists for Hungary
Olympic silver medalists for Hungary
Serbian female canoeists
Olympic medalists in canoeing
ICF Canoe Sprint World Championships medalists in kayak
Medalists at the 2012 Summer Olympics
Medalists at the 2008 Summer Olympics
Medalists at the 2004 Summer Olympics
Olympic bronze medalists for Hungary
Croats of Vojvodina